Mario Rosas Ruiz (born 14 January 1927) was a Colombian sprinter. He competed in the men's 400 metres and 400 meters hurdles at the 1948 Summer Olympics.

References

External links
 

1927 births
Living people
Athletes (track and field) at the 1948 Summer Olympics
Colombian male sprinters
Colombian male hurdlers
Olympic athletes of Colombia
Place of birth missing (living people)
Sportspeople from Bogotá
20th-century Colombian people